Depot Glacier is in North Cascades National Park in the U.S. state of Washington, on the northeast slopes of Mount Redoubt. Melt from the glacier feeds into Depot Creek which flows into Chilliwack Lake. The Redoubt Glacier lies to the east while the West Depot Glacier is separated from Depot Glacier by a ridge.

See also
List of glaciers in the United States

References

Glaciers of the North Cascades
Glaciers of Whatcom County, Washington
Glaciers of Washington (state)